Ozols (Old orthography: O(h)sol; feminine: Ozola) is a Latvian surname, derived from the Latvian word for "oak". Individuals with the surname include:

Ozols (real name Girts Rozentals; born 1978), Latvian hiphop artist
Andris Ozols (born 1968), Latvian businessman
Auseklis Ozols (born 1941), American painter
Dainis Ozols (born 1966), Latvian cyclist
Karlis Ozols (1912–2001), Australian chess player
Kārlis Ozols-Priednieks (1896–1938), Latvian poet
Otto Ozols (pen name of Mārtiņš Barkovskis; born 1970), Latvian writer and social activist
Roberts Ozols (1905–2002), Latvian cyclist
Saskia Ozols (born 1978), American artist
Voldemārs Ozols (1884–1949), Latvian politician

Dana Reizniece-Ozola
Guna Ozola

See also
Ozoliņš
Ozolin
Ozolles, France

Latvian-language masculine surnames